Martin Green may refer to:

Martin Green (author) (1932–2015), scholar and author
Martin Green (musician) (born 1980), accordionist in Scottish folk trio Lau
Martin Green (professor) (born 1948), pioneer in solar cells
Martin E. Green (1815–1863), Confederate brigadier general in the American Civil War
Martyn Green (1899–1975), English actor and singer
Marty Green (River City), fictional character in Scottish soap opera River City

See also
Martin Grene (1616–1667), English Jesuit
Martin Gren (born 1962), Swedish entrepreneur